Paulo Henrique Saraiva Câmara (born August 8, 1972, in Recife) is a Brazilian politician who served as governor of Pernambuco from 2015 to 2023. He became Governor of Pernambuco on January 1, 2015.

Political career 
In 2014, he was elected governor of Pernambuco. Câmara endorsed Marina Silva in first round and Aécio Neves in second round.

References

External links
Governador Paulo Câmara 

1972 births
Living people
Brazilian Socialist Party politicians
Brazilian Democratic Movement politicians
Governors of Pernambuco
Politicians from Recife